Pablo Troise (born 17 April 1936) is a Uruguayan lawyer and former judge.

From 2003 to 2006 he was a member of the Supreme Court of Justice.

References

1936 births
20th-century Uruguayan judges
21st-century Uruguayan judges
Supreme Court of Uruguay justices
Living people